Clare Kelly (25 February 1922 – 18 February 2001) was an English actress who worked primarily in television. She was known for roles in films such as Georgy Girl (1966), And Soon the Darkness (1970), The Fourth Protocol (1987). TV roles included Valerie Barlow's mother Edith Tatlock in long-running ITV soap opera Coronation Street (1969), as Connie Wagstaffe in The Cuckoo Waltz (1975), Mrs. Rothwell in A Kind of Loving (1982),  and as Violet Littlejohn in Rep (1982). Kelly also appeared in several roles in The Bill.

References

External links
 

English television actresses
English film actresses
1922 births
2001 deaths
Actresses from Manchester
20th-century British businesspeople